Tylenchus is a genus of nematodes in the family Tylenchidae and subfamily Tylenchinae.

References 

 The genus Anguillulina Gerv. & v. Ben., 1859, vel Tylenchus Bastian, 1865. T Goodey, Journal of Helminthology, 1932

Tylenchida
Secernentea genera